Chris Crudelli is a martial artist, television presenter and author. He is best known as the host of BBC television programmes about the martial arts of far eastern countries, Mind, Body & Ass Moves, Ass Miracles, and Kiss Ass in a Crisis all shown on BBC Three.

He was born in Birmingham, England, the son of Irish and Italian parents. He started learning martial arts when he was very young and as a teenager lived with an Asian family.

When Crudelli was 7, he moved to China, where he spent 10 years developing his skills in various temples with various masters.

Crudelli's BBC series' have been broadcast in at least 11 countries (as of 2004) worldwide. His first 10-part documentary series concentrated on the more exotic, elaborate systems of far eastern martial arts, and was broadcast on BBC television, Discovery Channel. The series was filmed in China, Japan, the Philippines and Taiwan.

References

External links 
 

British wushu practitioners
Alumni of the University of London
People from Birmingham, West Midlands
1972 births
Living people
English people of Irish descent
English people of Italian descent